Local elections were held in the province of Zamboanga del Sur of the Philippines, on May 9, 2022, as part of the 2022 general election. Voters will select candidates for all local positions: a municipal and city mayor, vice mayor and councilors, as well as members of the Sangguniang Panlalawigan, the governor, vice governor and representatives for the two districts of Zamboanga del Sur.

Provincial elections 
All incumbents are marked in Italic

Gubernatorial race 
Incumbent Governor Victor Yu is running for re-election under PDP–Laban. He will face off former representative and former governor Aurora Cerilles whom he easily defeated during the 2019 local elections by almost 100,000 votes.

Vice gubernatorial race

Provincial board

1st District

2nd District

Congressional elections

1st District

2nd District

City and municipal elections

1st district

Pagadian City
Incumbent mayor Sammy Co is running for re-election; vice mayor Maphilindo Obaob is eligible for re-election, but opted to run for 1st district board member.

Aurora

Dumingag

Josefina

Labangan

Mahayag

Midsalip
Incumbent vice mayor Stewart Padayhag opted to run for mayor.

Molave

Ramon Magsaysay
Mayor Nilo Borinaga and vice mayor Margie Arcite-Machon, both incumbents elected after the 2019 local elections, are switching positions in this election.

Sominot

Tambulig

Tukuran
Incumbent vice mayor Delfina Cortina is running for mayor.

2nd district

Bayog

Dimataling

Dinas

Dumalinao

Guipos

Kumalarang

Lakewood

Lapuyan

Margosatubig
Mayor George Minor and vice mayor Totoy Agua, all incumbents in their positions, are running for reelection.

Pitogo
Incumbent mayor James Yecyec is running for reelection, while vice mayor Zosimo Garban is running for mayor.

San Miguel
Incumbent mayor Dodong Martinez is running for vice mayor.

San Pablo

Tabina
Incumbent vice mayor Greg Dayondon and Sangguniang Bayan member Anthony Dayondon are running for mayor. Despite Greg Dayondon's affiliation with Aksyon Demokratiko and that of Jessel Campomanes with People's Reform Party, they are running as independents based on COMELEC records.

Tigbao
Incumbent mayor Dodong Carcallas is running for reelection, while vice mayor Joy Balandra is running for Sangguniang Bayan member.

Vincenzo A. Sagun

References

External links
COMELEC official website

2022 Philippine local elections
Politics of Zamboanga del Sur
May 2022 events in the Philippines